Willem Stibolt (9 June 1890 – 5 April 1964) was a Norwegian tennis player. He competed in two events at the 1912 Summer Olympics.

References

1890 births
1964 deaths
Norwegian male tennis players
Olympic tennis players of Norway
Tennis players at the 1912 Summer Olympics
Sportspeople from Drammen
20th-century Norwegian people